{{Infobox sportsperson
| name = 
| image = 
| imagesize = 
| caption = 
| nationality = 
| birth_date = 
| birth_place = Jamaica
| sport = Track and Field
| event = Sprints, Hurdles
| collegeteam = Baylor University
| pb = 100 m: 11.09 (Texas 2021)
200 m: 24.13 (Kingston 2020)100mH: 12.45 (Texas 2022)
| medaltemplates = 

}}Ackera Nugent''' (born 29 April 2002) is a Jamaican athlete who specializes in sprinting. She is the 2021 World Athletics U20 Champion in the 100m hurdles.

References

External links 

 Ackera Nugent at World Athletics

2002 births
Living people
Jamaican female sprinters
Jamaican female hurdlers
World Athletics U20 Championships winners
Athletes (track and field) at the 2018 Summer Youth Olympics
Baylor Bears women's track and field athletes
21st-century Jamaican women